The National Internet Exchange of India (NIXI) is a non-profit company incorporated under Section 25 of the India Companies Act, 1956 (now section 8 under Companies Act 2013) with an objective of facilitating improved internet services in the country.

History
Registered on 19 June 2003, its primary purpose is to facilitate exchange of domestic internet traffic between the peering ISPs, Content players and any other organisations with their own AS number. This enables more efficient use of international bandwidth, saving foreign exchange and also improves the quality of service (QoS) for internet users by avoiding multiple international hops and thus reducing latency.

Utilising servers routed through and administered by India, it also reduces the chances of Indian data being intercepted unlawfully by NSA and GCHQ. NIXI is managed and operated on a neutral basis and currently has 40 operational network operations center (NOCs) located in multiple parts of the country.

Since 2005, NIXI has also created INRegistry (.in domain) as its autonomous body for maintenance of .IN domain.

Since December 2012, NIXI also manages the National Internet registry of the country delegation Internet Protocol addresses (IPv4 and IPv6) and autonomous system numbers to its affiliates.

Effective from December 27, 2021, bulk domain registrations, with individuals registrant registering for more than 2 or an entity registering for more than 100 .in domains are required to seek prior approval from the CEO of National Internet Exchange of India.

See also 
 List of Internet exchange points
 Internet in India

References

External links 
 National Internet Exchange of India
 India's 1st 'Net exchange' to be ready soon

2003 establishments in Delhi
Executive branch of the government of India
Information technology organisations based in India
Internet exchange points in Asia
Companies based in New Delhi
Technology companies established in 2003